Being Myself is a 1998 studio album by Lena Horne, and was the final original studio album released during her lifetime. It came out shortly before she turned 81.

Horne initially began work on the album in 1995; however, the project was left unfinished and Horne entered the studio in 1997 to record the songs presented in this album. Horne recorded three tracks for the original version of this album: "Black Is," "Chelsea Bridge" and "Willow Weep for Me." These tracks were later issued on the Blue Note compilation album Seasons of a Life.

Track listing 
 "Some of My Best Friends Are the Blues" (Jimmy Smith) – 3:43
 "As Long as I Live" (Harold Arlen, Ted Koehler) – 2:27
 "Autumn in New York" (Vernon Duke) – 4:25
 "It's All Right with Me" (Cole Porter) – 3:17
 "A Sleepin' Bee" (Harold Arlen, Truman Capote) – 3:36
 "Imagination" (Johnny Burke, Jimmy Van Heusen) – 5:49
 "How Long Has This Been Going On?" (George Gershwin, Ira Gershwin) – 4:42
 "After You, Who?" (Porter) – 3:15
 "Willow Weep for Me" (Ann Ronell) – 3:54
 "What Am I Here For?" (Duke Ellington, Frankie Laine) – 3:18

Personnel

Performance 
 Lena Horne – vocals
 George Benson - guitar
 Donald Harrison - saxophone
 Milt Jackson - vibraphone
 Mike Renzi - piano
 Rodney Jones - guitar
 Benjamin Brown - double bass
 Akira Tana - drums
 Jeremy Lubbock - string arrangements (3, 6)

References 

1998 albums
Lena Horne albums
Blue Note Records albums